The 2010 President's Cup was a professional tennis tournament played on outdoor hard courts. It was the fourth edition of the tournament which was part of the 2010 ATP Challenger Tour. It took place in Astana, Kazakhstan between 1 and 7 November 2010.

ATP entrants

Seeds

 Rankings are as of October 25, 2010.

Other entrants
The following players received wildcards into the singles main draw:
  Danjil Braun
  Evgeny Donskoy
  Danai Udomchoke
  Serizhan Yessenbekov

The following players received entry from the qualifying draw:
  Mikhail Ledovskikh
  Petru-Alexandru Luncanu
  Denis Matsukevich
  Vitali Reshetnikov

Champions

Singles

 Ivan Dodig def.  Igor Kunitsyn, 6–4, 6–3

Doubles

 Colin Fleming /  Ross Hutchins def.  Mikhail Elgin /  Alexander Kudryavtsev, 6–3, 7–6(10)

External links
ITF Search 

President's Cup
President's Cup (tennis)